The yellow-green vireo (Vireo flavoviridis) is a small American passerine bird. It is migratory breeding from Mexico to Panama and wintering in the northern and eastern Andes and the western Amazon Basin.

Taxonomy
The yellow-green vireo was formally described by the American ornithologist John Cassin in 1851 under the binomial name Vireosylvia flavoviridis. The specific epithet combines the Latin flavus meaning "yellow" and viridis meaning "green". The type locality is San Juan de Nicaragua. The yellow-green vireo is now placed in the genus Vireo that was introduced in 1808 by the French ornithologist Louis Jean Pierre Vieillot.

Five subspecies are recognised:
 V. f. hypoleucus Van Rossem & Hachisuka, 1937 – northwest Mexico (southeast Sonora to south Sinaloa)
 V. f. flavoviridis (Cassin, 1851) – north central, northeast Mexico to Panama
 V. f. forreri Madarász, 1885 – Islas Marías (off west Mexico)
 V. f. perplexus (Phillips, AR, 1991) – north Guatemala
 V. f. vanrossemi (Phillips, AR, 1991) – southeast El Salvador

Description
The adult yellow-green vireo is 14–14.7 cm in length and weighs 18.5 g. It has olive-green upperparts and a dusky-edged gray crown. There is a dark line from the bill to the red-brown eyes, and a white supercilium. The underparts are white with yellow breast sides and flanks. Young birds are duller with brown eyes, a brown tint to the back, and less yellow on the underparts. The adult yellow-green vireo differs from the red-eyed vireo in its much yellower underparts, lack of a black border to the duller gray crown, yellower upperparts and different eye color.

Some individuals are difficult to separate, even in the hand, from the similar red-eyed vireo, with which it is sometimes considered conspecific. Its exact status as a passage bird in countries such as Venezuela is therefore uncertain.

The yellow-green vireo has a nasal  call, and the song is a repetitive veree veer viree, fee’er vireo viree, shorter and faster than that of the red-eyed vireo. This species rarely sings on its wintering grounds.

Distribution and habitat
It breeds from southern Texas (occasionally the Rio Grande Valley) in the United States and the western and eastern mountain ranges of northern Mexico (the Sierra Madre Occidental and Sierra Madre Oriental—also the Cordillera Neovolcanica) south to central Panama. It is migratory, wintering in the northern and eastern Andes and the western Amazon basin. This vireo occurs in the canopy and middle levels of light woodland, the edges of forest, and gardens at altitudes from sea level to 1500 m.

Behaviour and ecology

Breeding
The 6.5-cm-wide cup nest is built by the female from a wide range of plant materials, and attached to a stout twig normally 1.5–3.5 m above the ground in a tree, but occasionally up to 12 m high. The normal clutch is two or three brown-marked white eggs laid from March to June and incubated by the female alone, although the male helps to feed the chicks. The breeding birds return to Central America from early February to March, and most depart southwards by mid-October.

Feeding
Yellow-green vireos feed on  insects gleaned from tree foliage, favoring caterpillars and beetles. They also eat small fruits, including mistletoe berries, and, in winter quarters, those of Cymbopetalum mayanum (Annonaceae) and gumbo-limbo (Bursera simaruba).

Gallery

References

Further reading

External links 
Xeno-canto: audio recordings of the yellow-green vireo
Photo; Article CBRC Rare Bird Photos, California Bird Records Committee
Photo-2 CBRC Rare Bird Photos Article
Yellow-green Vireo photo gallery VIREO-Visual Resources for Ornithology Photo-High Res--(Close-up)
Yellow-green Vireo photo; Article "Avifauna of Eco-Region, Sierra Nevada de Santa Marta, Colombia"

Birds of Bolivia
Birds of Brazil
Birds of Central America
Birds of Colombia
Birds of Ecuador
Birds of Peru
Birds of South America
Birds of Venezuela
Birds of Mexico
Birds of the Rio Grande valleys
Birds of the Sierra Madre Occidental
Birds of the Sierra Madre Oriental
Birds of the Sierra Madre del Sur
Birds of the Trans-Mexican Volcanic Belt
Birds of the Yucatán Peninsula
Migratory birds (Western Hemisphere)
Vireo (genus)
Birds described in 1851
Taxa named by John Cassin